is a 13-episode Japanese anime television series produced by P.A. Works and directed by Junji Nishimura. The screenplay is written by Rika Satō and Junji Nishimura with character designs by Miki Takeshita. The anime aired in Japan between July and September 2014. A manga adaptation was serialized in Pony Canyon's Ponimaga online magazine, and a light novel series has also been published.

Plot
Tōko Fukami's family runs a glass-working business in a small seaside town named . She hangs out with her four best friends at a cafe called . During the summer break of their senior year in high school, they meet a transfer student named Kakeru Okikura, who claims that a voice from the future talks to him, and that it has led him to Tōko.

Characters

Main characters

Tōko is a high school girl from Fukui Prefecture and is the protagonist of Glasslip. She is the daughter of a glass workshop owner, and she dreams of becoming a glass artisan. She has big hazel eyes and long brown hair which is seen down, with two braids on either side. She has a cheerful personality and never seems to be upset. She likes to draw. When she focuses on glass, she can see images from the future. She has feelings for Kakeru.

Kakeru is a mysterious and aloof high school student who appears to have some relationship with Tōko. He has black hair and blue eyes. He recently transferred from his old school and is a third year. Tōko's first impression of Kakeru was "David". He has feelings for Tōko.

Yanagi is a high school student who is taking lessons to become a model. Yanagi has olive brown eyes and mid-length brown hair which curls at the bottom and is usually seen wearing a colored bow in her hair, which is dark red and pale yellow. Yanagi sometimes has a tsundere-like personality, but usually is cheerful and participates in most conversations. She has feelings for Yukinari and is close friends with Tōko.

Yukinari is Yanagi's step brother. He is on his high school's track team, but is in rehabilitation at the beginning of the series. He has black hair and dark green eyes. He is a cool and laid back boy. He is in his third year much like his friends. He had feelings for Tōko and was jealous of Kakeru.

Sachi is a quiet and soft spoken third-year high school student. She has black shoulder-length hair and violet eyes. She is usually seen wearing her glasses and reading a book. Upon their first meeting, Sachi takes a disliking to Kakeru.

Hiro is a cheerful high school boy who is always seen smiling. He has brown hair pulled back with a white band and has dark brown eyes. He has feelings for Sachi. His grandfather runs a cafe called Kazemichi where he and his friends often hang out.

Other characters
 is Tōko's and Hina's father. He runs a glass workshop named Yataglass Studio. 
 is Tōko's and Hina's mother. 
 is Tōko's younger sister and is a junior high school student. She is in the school's swimming club. She acknowledges Yukinari for his passion for running. She's seen smiling when her swimming club teammates noticed Yukinari with a girl, possibly with Yanagi. 
 is Hiro's older sister and is a college student. She just got her driver's license. 
 is Hiro's grandfather who runs Kazemichi cafe. 
 is Kakeru's father. 
 is Kakeru's mother and a pianist. 
 is Sachi's mother.

Media

Print
A manga adaptation titled , written by Kazemichi and illustrated by Mayumi Katō, was serialized in Pony Canyon's online manga magazine Ponimaga from July 3 to December 18, 2014. A three-volume light novel series, written by Yoshimori Uchi and illustrated by Shino, were published by Pony Canyon under their Ponican Book imprint from October 3, 2014 to July 3, 2015.

Anime
The 13-episode anime television series is produced by P.A. Works and is directed by Junji Nishimura. The series aired between July 3 and September 25, 2014 on Tokyo MX. The screenplay is written by Rika Satō and Junji Nishimura, and the music is produced by Akito Matsuda. The series was simulcast in the United States, Canada, Australia, New Zealand, South Africa, Turkey, Latin America, parts of Europe, the Middle East, and North Africa by the Internet streaming website Crunchyroll. The anime has been licensed in North America by Sentai Filmworks.

Episode list

Reception
Matt Packard of Anime News Network praised Glasslip for being visually beautiful, but criticized it for the generic characters, the lack of explanations for the supernatural phenomena introduced at the beginning of the series, and the presence of too many incongruities. Stig Høgset, writing for THEM Anime Reviews, also praised the striking visuals but found the characters believable and showed maturity when dealing with their respective relationships. Høgset ultimately found the show disappointing because its great start was marred by Tōko's visions leading toward a vague conclusion, saying that it "basically sells its own gimmick as a huge waste of time." Isaac Akers of The Fandom Post praised the series for its "aesthetic expression of [the concept of] mono no aware" through a traditional romantic drama narrative with characters that deliver organic teenage angst but said that its appeal depends on the viewer, concluding that: "It's unlike anything else I've seen, and its numerous strengths in expressing its core theme make for a show that's fascinating to watch. It's not a show that I'd recommend to everyone, but for those who are looking for what Glasslip is offering, you won't be let down."

References

External links
 

2014 anime television series debuts
Anime with original screenplays
Drama anime and manga
P.A.Works
Romance anime and manga
Sentai Filmworks
Slice of life anime and manga
Tokyo MX original programming